Cleveland is an unincorporated community in Conway County, Arkansas, United States. Cleveland has a post office with ZIP code 72030. Cleveland was founded in 1890, named after former President Grover Cleveland.

"Downtown" Cleveland consists of the Cleveland Post Office, the Cleveland General Store and Gas Station (now closed), the Cleveland Volunteer Fire Department, the Cleveland Community Center, and the Cleveland Cemetery, which is the final resting place for a handful of veterans from the American Civil War, as well as 20th century conflicts such as World War I and World War II.

Highway 95, which runs through Cleveland, connects the cities of Morrilton (Conway County) and Clinton (Van Buren County). The Ozark National Forest is nearby.

The main industries in Cleveland are commercial broiler chicken growers for Tyson Foods, cattle husbandry, and natural gas extraction, which is mostly performed by Southwestern Energy, as part of the Fayetteville Shale natural gas deposit.

Education 

References

http://www.encyclopediaofarkansas.net/encyclopedia/entry-detail.aspx?entryID=6457

Unincorporated communities in Conway County, Arkansas
Unincorporated communities in Arkansas